Leicester Forest East services is a motorway service station situated between junctions 21 and 21A of the M1 motorway, near Leicester, England.

History
It was designed for the opening of the second phase of the M1 in 1966 (seven years after the first phase was completed), based on an Italian design used on the Autostrade. This design is very rare in Britain.

Construction
Work was to start in November 1963, and the site was to open in November 1964.The contract was awarded on Friday 21 August 1964 to R.M. Douglas Construction Ltd of Erdington. The architect was Howard V Lobb.

Opening
It was opened on Friday 6 May 1966 by Sir Cyril Osborne, the MP for Louth.

Food
The services features a bridge-restaurant, between the two bases crossing the motorway, containing all of the service station's restaurants. At the time of opening it was operated by the Ross Group and featured a Terence Conran designed restaurant with a waitress silver service restaurant.

Ross Group had carried out research in the US, Canada and in Europe. The whole site seated 800 people.

 The Captain's Table Restaurant
 Two transport cafes, seating 105

Buildings
It would have parking for 200 vehicles.

Description
It contains a number of shops and fast food outlets straddling the motorway.

There is no legal vehicular access to the motorway service station from nearby Leicester Forest East, although there is nothing physically stopping cars from exiting to the A47.

Proposed closure
Leicester Forest East services faced permanent closure in 2017 if the M1/M69 junction had been developed to increase capacity to accommodate predicted traffic growth.

References

External links

 University of Leicester Centre for English Local History blog
Motorway Services Online — The Rise and Fall of Leicester Forest East
Motorway Services Online — Leicester Forest East Services

1966 establishments in England
M1 motorway service stations
Welcome Break motorway service stations
Buildings and structures in Leicestershire
Transport in Leicestershire